Authorpe was a railway station on the East Lincolnshire Railway, which served the village of Authorpe in Lincolnshire between 1848 and 1964. The station was closed to passengers in 1961, and withdrawal of goods facilities took place in 1964. The line through the station is closed.

History
The station was opened on 3 September 1848 after the hamlet of Authorpe which lies to the east. This section was the last to be completed in September 1848 at an agreed cost of £123,000. Authorpe station was one mile to the north of Aby for Claythorpe station and straddled a level crossing over Scrub Lane which runs through the centre of Authorpe. Staggered platforms were situated either side of the crossing gates, which were controlled by a signal box located on the down side of the line and to the north of the crossing. The signal box also controlled the goods yard opposite the up platform which comprised two sidings; the station dealt with a variety of goods including livestock. Opposite the signal box on the north side of the crossing was the stationmaster's house incorporating a booking office. A small brick waiting shelter was provided for passengers using the up platform. The station was closed to passengers on 11 September 1961, the same day as Aby for Claythorpe, but goods facilities remained for a further two-and-a-half years until 30 March 1964.

Present day
The stationmaster's house has survived as a private residence and has been extended. The trackbed adjacent to the house is now incorporated into the garden, comprised within which is the down platform. The degraded remains of the up platform remain in an overgrown state. It is also possible that the goods shed may have survived.

References

Sources

External links
 Authorpe station on navigable O. S. map

Disused railway stations in Lincolnshire
Railway stations in Great Britain closed in 1961
Railway stations in Great Britain opened in 1848
Former Great Northern Railway stations